Bodianus axillaris, the axilspot hogfish,  coral pigfish or turncoat hogfish, is a species of wrasse native to the Indo-Pacific.

Description
The axilspot hogfish is sexually dimorphic with the adult males being coloured reddish-brown on the front part of their bodies contrasting with the white posterior end and having a  sizeable black spot at the base of the pectoral fin, as well as on the dorsal and anal fins. The females and the juveniles are a blackish colour marked with white blotches along the upper and lower flanks. The juveniles of this species resemble those of the split-level hogfish (Bodianus mesothorax) but possess white instead of yellow spots.

Distribution
Axilspot hogfish are found in the Indo-Pacific, from the Red Sea to South Africa, Marshall Islands, Marquesan, and Tuamoto Islands, north to Japan.

Habitat and biology
The larger fish are occasionally found in deeper water below . The juveniles are found singly in caves or under overhangs where they behave as cleaner fish, adults will sometimes behave in this way too. Their diet is made up of benthic, hard-shelled, invertebrates such as molluscs and crustaceans. It is oviparous and the males and females form distinct pairs when spawning.

Human use
It is infrequently encountered in the aquarium trade, and is not a species of interest to commercial fisheries.

Species description
The axilspot hogfish was formally described by the English zoologist Edward Turner Bennett as Labrus axillaris in 1832 with the type locality being given as Mauritius.

References

External links
 Zipcodezoo

Bibliography
 Bennett, E. T. 1832. Observations on a collection of fishes from the Mauritius, presented by Mr. Telfair, with characters of new genera and species. Proc. Zool. Soc. Lond. 1830-31 (pt 1): 165–169. 
 Helfman, G., B. Collette i D. Facey: The diversity of fishes. Blackwell Science, Malden, Massachusetts, United States, 1997.
 Moyle, P. i J. Cech.: Fishes: An Introduction to Ichthyology, 4. ed., Upper Saddle River, New Jersey, United States: Prentice-Hall. Any 2000.
 Nelson, J.: Fishes of the World, 3rd. ed.. New York, United States: John Wiley and Sons. Any 1994.
 Wheeler, A.: The World Encyclopedia of Fishes, 2nd. ed., London: Macdonald. Any 1985.
 Allen, G.R. & R. Swainston. 1988. The Marine Fishes of North-Western Australia. A Field Guide for Anglers and Divers. Western Australian Museum. Pp. 201.

axillaris
Fish of Thailand
Taxa named by Edward Turner Bennett
Fish described in 1832